Begonia acutifolia, the holly-leaf begonia, is a species of flowering plant in the family Begoniaceae, native to Cuba and Jamaica, and introduced to Saint Helena. Shade tolerant, it is kept as a house plant, or outside in USDA hardiness zone 9b or warmer.

References

acutifolia
Low light plants
Flora of Cuba
Flora of Jamaica
Plants described in 1787
Flora without expected TNC conservation status